Earth, Wind & Fire: Live at Montreux 1997 is a DVD by the band Earth, Wind & Fire which was issued in November 2004 by Eagle Rock Entertainment. The DVD has also been certified Gold in the US by the RIAA.

Overview
The DVD features the band's performances at the 1997 and 1998 editions of the Montreux Jazz Festival.

Set list
 (1.) "Rock That"
 (2.) "Jupiter"
 (3.) "Saturday Nite"
 (4.) "Revolution"
 (5.) "Gratitude"
 (6.) "September"
 (7.) "Let's Groove"
 (8.) "Rockit"
 (9.) "Sun Goddess"
 (10.) "Can't Hide Love"
 (11.) "That's the Way of the World"
 (12.) "Drum Solo"
 (13.) "Reasons"
 (14.) "Fantasy"
 (15.) "Mo’s Solo"
 (16.) "Boogie Wonderland
 (17.) "After The Love Has Gone"
 (18.) "Sing a Song"
 (19.) "Shining Star"
 (20.) "Devotion"

Bonus 1998 Performance 
 (21.) "Kalimba Funk Intro"
 (22.) "Medley: Pride/Mighty Mighty"
 (23.) "In the Stone"
 (24.) "Solo Percussion"
 (25.) "I’ll Write a Song"
 (26.) "Love’s Holiday"
 (27.) "Getaway"

References

Earth, Wind & Fire video albums
2004 video albums
Live video albums
2004 live albums